Alexander John McLachlan (2 November 1872 – 28 May 1956) was an Australian politician. He served as a Senator for South Australia from 1926 to 1944, representing the Nationalist Party and United Australia Party. He held ministerial office in the Lyons Government as Vice-President of the Executive Council (1932–1934), Minister in charge of Development
and Scientific and Industrial Research (1932–1937), and Postmaster-General of Australia (1934–1938).

Early life
McLachlan was born in Naracoorte, South Australia and educated at Hamilton Academy, and Mount Gambier High School. He was an articled clerk in Mount Gambier and completed the Final Certificate in Law at the University of Adelaide in 1895. He was in partnership with Charles Kingston from 1897 to 1905. In 1898 he married Cecia Antoinette Billiet. He was a director of the Hume Pipe Co. (Aust) Ltd from its foundation in 1920.

Political career 

McLachlan ran unsuccessfully for election for the seat of Victoria in 1896 and for Adelaide in 1912 in the South Australian House of Assembly. He also ran unsuccessfully for the Legislative Council in 1905, the Australian House of Representatives seat of Adelaide in 1908 and 1910 and for the Senate in 1922.

In the 1925 elections, he was finally elected to the Senate as a Nationalist, although he in fact filled a casual vacancy in January 1926, prior to the commencement of his term in July. He was an honorary minister in the Bruce ministry from July 1926, often acting for absent ministers. He represented Australia at the meeting of the League of Nations in 1928 and signed the Kellogg-Briand Pact. He was Vice-President of the Executive Council from 1932 to 1934 in the Lyons government and Minister in charge of Development and Scientific and Industrial Research (responsible for the Council of Scientific and Industrial Research) from  1932 to 1937. From 1934 to 1938, he was Postmaster-General and issued many licences for commercial radio stations.

McLachlan became an outspoken advocate of military preparedness and supported sanctions against Italy in response to its invasion of Ethiopia, antagonising cabinet. He also pressed Lyons over his unwillingness to proclaim the National Health and Pensions Insurance Bill of 1938. On 3 November 1938, McLachlan was questioned in parliament over the letting of a contract by the Postmaster-General's Department to the Hume Pipe Co. Lyons' lukewarm defence caused McLachlan to resign as Postmaster-General the same day. He remained on the backbench until the expiry of his Senate term in June 1944, having failed to get party pre-selection for the 1943 election.

Personal life
McLachlan died in 1956 at the Mercy Hospital, East Melbourne, childless and having survived his wife who had died in 1941.

Notes

1872 births
1956 deaths
Members of the Cabinet of Australia
Nationalist Party of Australia members of the Parliament of Australia
United Australia Party members of the Parliament of Australia
Members of the Australian Senate for South Australia
Members of the Australian Senate
20th-century Australian politicians